Rudy Rasmus is a pastor, author, and humanitarian. He co-pastors the St. John's United Methodist Church located in downtown Houston with his wife Juanita. 

St. John's began with nine members in 1992, and is now one of the most culturally diverse congregations in the country.

Career 
Rasmus was a monthly contributor to Oprah Winfrey's O Magazine and has recently completed a doctorate at United Theological Seminary. He is a 2008 gospel music industry Stellar Award nominee for the music project "Touch" and is the author of three books, including Jesus Insurgency with coauthor Dottie Escobedo-Frank (Abingdon Publishing, Nashville), and Touch: Pressing against the wounds of a broken world (Thomas Nelson Publishers, Nashville). His latest book is entitled Love.Period – When all else fails. 

Rasmus founded a nonprofit corporation, the Bread of Life, Inc. with his wife in December 1992 and began serving dinners to the homeless in the sanctuary at St. John's. The organization provides an array of services to homeless men and women seven nights a week in the Bread of Life facility on the St. John's campus. The project provides hot meals to the homeless and distributes over 9 tons of fresh food weekly to hungry families. Thanks to generous support from collaborations with local and national partners and significant donations over the years from Tina, Beyoncé, and Solange Knowles, Pastor Rudy has completed over $30 million in housing development projects for the previously homeless in Downtown Houston. The Temenos CDC portfolio includes the Knowles-Temenos Apartments, a 43-unit Single Room Occupancy development, the 80-unit Temenos II Apartments both designed to provide permanent living accommodations for formerly homeless individuals, and the Temenos III Apartments designed for chronic inebriates and the most vulnerable homeless individuals in the Houston community. Eighteen years ago Kelly Rowland teamed up with Beyoncé and Tina Knowles to build the Knowles-Rowland Center for Youth where community empowerment activities for the young and old take place every week. The facility is currently serves as a distribution center meeting the needs weekly of Houstonians in need. Most recently Pastor Rudy teamed up with Tina and Beyoncé to help 100,000 flood victims in the wake of Hurricane Harvey in Houston. Rudy's most recent project is aimed at developing a boarding school for young men who are aging out of foster care. Today, with a focus on social impact investing, the Bread of Life owns and operates the Amazing KMAZ 102.5fm radio station where Rudy can be heard throughout the week on his program "The Love Revolution."

St. John's provides HIV/AIDS testing to churchgoers on Sundays through the "Get Tested Project." After many years of service to the community, Pastor Rudy received the Jefferson Award at a ceremony in Washington, DC in 2009. For years Pastor Rudy coordinated domestic and global anti-hunger initiatives in conjunction with Beyoncé’s concert tours and travels extensively developing food programs around the world for people experiencing food insufficiency.

Personal life
Rasmus and his wife Juanita have been married for 34 years. They have two daughters.

References

External links 
The work of the people 
 Houston area pastor works with Beyonce
 Column offers advice for ethical quandaries-NPR
 Beyoncé's pastor Rudy Rasmus talks about his new book Love.Period

21st-century Methodist ministers
American humanitarians
Year of birth missing (living people)
Living people